Antonio Molinari (born 13 February 1967) is a former Italian male mountain runner (than masters athlete), thirteen-time world champion (one at individual level and twelve with the national team), at the World Mountain Running Championships.

Biography
With 12 participation in the World championships h is the second Italian after Marco De Gasperi with 15. He also won five national championships at individual senior level.

National titles
Italian Mountain Running Championships
Mountain running: 1997, 1998, 1999, 2000, 2001 (5)

See also
 Italy at the European Mountain Running Championships

References

External links
 Antonio Molinari profile at Association of Road Racing Statisticians
 http://www.molinarisport.it/concrete/index.php/search/ Antonio Molinari] profile at Molinari Sport

1967 births
Living people
Italian male mountain runners
Italian masters athletes
Snowshoe runners
World Mountain Running Championships winners
20th-century Italian people